Dolakha Bhimsen Temple is located in the Bhimeshwar municipality of Dolakha in Nepal, approximately  east of Charikot. The temple is roofless in the center and it houses a triangular-shaped stone idol of Bhimsen. The idol is believed to resemble three deities: Bhimeshwar in the morning, Mahadeva throughout the day, and Narayana in the evening. The temple attracts around 5,000 worshippers every week.

Mythology
The temple is devoted to Bhimsen, the second brother among the Pandavas depicted in the Hindu mythology of Mahabharata. It is believed that Pandavas spent their twelve years of exile in Dolakha.

According to local legend, twelve porters made a three-stoned stove to cook their rice near a temple. When they noticed that only one side of the rice was cooked, they flipped the rice over. As the cooked rice came in contact with the triangular-shaped black stone, it turned raw. One of the porters got angry and hit the stone with his ladle. The stone cracked and bled blood-coated milk. The porters realized that the stone was Bhimsen's.

History
The exact date of establishment is unknown. An inscription dated 1611 AD mentions the renovation of the temple.

Sweating of idol
The Bhimsen's statue perspires in the form of fluid-like drops from time to time. The perspiration is considered a bad omen for the country. It is believed that Bhimsen himself tries to protect his people by warning them through sweating. Historically, when such an event occurred, the priest soaked the sweat in cotton and sent the cotton to the royal palace. In return, the king would send two goats and a sum of money to clear away the misfortune. This custom has been discontinued after significant political changes within Nepal. Some of the sweating events include:
 During the change of the Rana regime, in 2007 BS, the idol is believed to have sweated.
 The idol is reported to sweat in 1934 before a devastating earthquake that killed 8,500 people.
 It was reported that the idol sweated a few days ahead of royal massacre that killed King Birendra and his family.
 The idol was reported to sweat on 20 February 2020. The incident was reported to President of Nepal and atonement rituals were carried out.

Gallery

See also
List of Hindu temples in Nepal

References

Hindu temples in Bagmati Province
Buildings and structures in Dolakha District